William "Sonny" Jackson (September 24, 1938 – July 10, 2021) was an American college football coach. He served as the head football coach at Nicholls State University from 1981 to 1986 and at McNeese State University from 1987 to 1989.

Coaching career

High School career
Prior to his college coaching career, Jackson was an assistant coach and later head football coach at St. Joseph Benedictine High School in Chauvin, Louisiana. He was also head coach at Central High School in Central, Louisiana.

College career
Jackson was an assistant coach at Northeast Louisiana University for two seasons from 1979 to 1980. In 1981, Jackson was hired for his first college head coaching position at his alma mater, Nicholls State University. He coached the Colonels for six seasons through 1986 and compiled a record of 39 wins, 28 losses and 1 tie. In 1986, he guided Nicholls State to its first appearance in the NCAA Division I-AA playoffs and led the team to their first playoff win.

From 1987 to 1989, Jackson was head football coach at McNeese State University and compiled a record of 13–20. He had a career college football coaching record of 52 wins, 48 losses and 1 tie in his nine seasons as a head coach.

Personal life
Jackson was a 1963 graduate of Nicholls State University. His son, Hud Jackson, is also a college football head coach.

He died on July 10, 2021.

Head coaching record

College

References

1938 births
2021 deaths
Louisiana–Monroe Warhawks football coaches
McNeese Cowboys football coaches
Nicholls Colonels football coaches
High school football coaches in Louisiana
Nicholls State University alumni